Zee Telugu is an Indian Telugu-language general entertainment pay television channel in India. It was launched on 12 September 2004 as Alpha Telugu and was rebranded as Zee Telugu on 18 May 2005. The channel is owned by Zee Entertainment Enterprises. Zee Telugu was the 9th most popular channel in India and had a TRP of 1593 impressions as of September 2021.

Establishment 
In 2004, Zee Network had channels in Bengali, Gujarati, Marathi, and Punjabi. Its proposed Telugu-language channel was expected to launch by August 2004, but the launch did not take place until September. The channel launched with the name Alpha TV Telugu, but was later renamed to Zee Telugu. It initially featured a large number of American films dubbed into Telugu. In August 2007, the network also dubbed Bollywood film Sholay from Hindi into Telugu as an experiment.

History 

In September 2005, the channel announced that Sanjay Reddy would be their new chief executive officer, succeeding Ajay Kumar, who had left several months previously. Reddy had previously worked at The Walt Disney Company and Pearl Media.

By December 2005, Zee Telugu had only achieved a 1.24% weekday and 1.86% weekend market share in Andhra Pradesh. As a result, it re-launched in order to shift the target market from a mass market to a segmented market of young professionals.

In late 2006, Zee Telugu began work on Sa Re Ga Ma Pa, a Telugu-language singing competition, and was scheduled to run for 35 episodes. Zee Telugu announced plans to launch Little Champs, a version of the show aimed at viewers ages 6–13, hosted by N. C. Karunya.

Programming

References

External links 
Official site
Zee Telugu on Zee5

Telugu-language television channels
Television channels and stations established in 2004
Zee Entertainment Enterprises
Television stations in Hyderabad
2004 establishments in Andhra Pradesh